Henri Bertrand (19 January, 1892 – 1 September, 1978) was a French entomologist.
 
In 1936, he worked at the marine biology station in Dinard where he specialised in crustaceans. He received many prizes for his research (Prix Passet, Prix Gadeau de Kerville) and was a member of many scientific societies. He studied in particular the larvae of water beetles. He published more than 200 notes on flies, mayflies and caddisflies. In 1978 he disappeared in the Pyrenees; his corpse was discovered the following year.

Works

References 

1892 births
1978 deaths
French entomologists
University of Paris alumni
20th-century French zoologists